The Camino Rojo mine is one of the largest silver mines in Mexico and in the world. The mine is located in the center of the country in Zacatecas. The mine has estimated reserves of 1.63 million oz of gold and 32.07 million oz of silver.

References 

Geography of Zacatecas
Silver mines in Mexico
Gold mines in Mexico